Marcilio Florencio Mota Filho commonly known as Nino (born 10 April 1997) is a Brazilian professional footballer who plays as a centre-back for Fluminense.

International career
On 17 June 2021, Nino was named in the Brazil squad for the 2020 Summer Olympics.

Career statistics

Honours
Fluminense
Taça Guanabara: 2022
Campeonato Carioca: 2022

Brazil Olympic
Summer Olympics: 2020

References

External links

1997 births
Living people
Brazilian footballers
Association football defenders
Sport Club do Recife players
Criciúma Esporte Clube players
Fluminense FC players
Campeonato Brasileiro Série A players
Campeonato Brasileiro Série B players
Olympic footballers of Brazil
Footballers at the 2020 Summer Olympics
Olympic medalists in football
Olympic gold medalists for Brazil
Medalists at the 2020 Summer Olympics
Sportspeople from Recife